The 1981 John Courage English Professional Championship was a professional non-ranking snooker tournament, which took place in March 1981 at Haden Hill Leisure Centre, Old Hill in the Metropolitan Borough of Sandwell, England.

Steve Davis won the title by defeating Tony Meo 9–3 in the final.

Main draw

References

English Professional Championship
English Professional Championship
English Professional Championship
English Professional Championship